Itapaci is a municipality in northern Goiás state, Brazil.  The population was 18,458 in 2010 (IBGE).  The total area of the municipality was 956.1 km² (10/10/2002).

History
The settlement began in the 1920s on the lands of the Água Fria and Barra cattle ranches.  Land was donated by a rancher called Domiciano Rodrigues Peixoto and a cross was erected in 1935.  The first name was Água Fria, later changed to Floresta.  In 1938 it became a district with the name Itapaci, which means "Beautiful Rock".  In 1945 it was raised to municipal status.

Geography
Itapaci is located on the São Patrício Pequeno River in the Ceres Microregion.  The distance to the state capital, Goiânia, is 230 kilometers.  Highway connections are made by GO-080 / Nerópolis / São Francisco de Goiás / BR-153 / Jaraguá / Rialma / GO-336.  See  Seplan for the complete list.

Neighboring municipalities are: Crixás, Guarinos, Hidrolina, Ipiranga de Goiás, Nova América, Nova Glória, Pilar de Goiás, Rubiataba and São Luíz do Norte.

Climate 
The climate is tropical humid with high maximum temperatures that can reach 37 °C.  The natural resources of the town are its mineral wealth.  There are deposits of mica, crystal, asbestos, and gold.  In the forests there are stands of hardwood.

Districts, Villages, and Hamlets
District: Aparecida de Goiás.
Village: Ponte Nova.
Hamlets: Santo Agostinho, São José do Caiamar, Vila Santana and Vila Trindade.

Demographics
Data obtained by the 2010 Census conducted by the IBGE (Brazilian Institute of Geography and Statistics)

The economy
The economy is based on livestock raising, agriculture, and services.
In 2006 there were 425 farms with a total area of 51,805 hectares, of which 3,500 hectares were cropland and 38,600 hectares were pasture.  Cattle raising is the main economic activity with 75,000 head in 2006.  There are plantations of rice, beans, corn, peanuts, and manioc.  The main crop was sugarcane with 4,800 ha. planted in 2006 and a production of 384,000 tons.
Industrial establishments: 24
Retail commercial establishments: 176
Distillery: Vale Verde Empreendimentos Agrícolas Ltda. (July/2007)
Financial institutions: Banco do Brasil S.A., Banco Itaú S.A, Caixa Econômica Federal, Banco Bradesco S.A. (10/04/2012)

Health and education
In 2007 there were 12 schools in activity with 5,853 students.  There was a campus of the Universidade Estadual de Goiás.  The literacy rate was 85.4% in 2000.  There were 02 hospitals with 99 beds and 15 doctors.  The infant mortality rate was 31.12 in 2000 (in 1,000 live births)
Municipal Human Development Index:  0.724
State ranking:  56 (out of 246 municipalities in 2010)
National ranking:  2,524 (out of 5,507 municipalities in 2000) For the complete list see frigoletto.com.br

See also
List of municipalities in Goiás
Microregions of Goiás

References 

Frigoletto
Highway distances from Goiânia

Municipalities in Goiás